Farewill is a private company that provides will-writing, probate, and cremation services in the UK. Founded in 2015. It claims to be the UK's biggest will writer. Farewill is registered in England and Wales with the Law Society and was declared the National Will Writing Firm of the year in 2019. 

It is a B2C product but is also provided as a free service through several charities.

History
Farewill is a London-based company founded in 2015 by Dan Garrett (Co-Founder & CEO) and Tom Rogers (Co-Founder & CPTO). Garrett started the company after being inspired whilst designing new products for elderly residents in a care home in Tokyo. 

Dan Garrett returned to the UK and moved into the death industry, where he organised 15 funerals and gained a qualification in will writing, founding Farewill on July 24th, 2015 to "make [death care] easier". 

In 2016, following their seed funding round, Tracy Doree, angel investor and founder of venture capital firm Kindred Capital, joined Farewill as its Chairperson. In addition to Tracy, the company has 3 additional Directors: Tom Rogers, its Chief Product and Technology Officer (CPTO), Tim Levene of Augmentum Fintech and Dan Garrett, the CEO.

In 2019, Farewill was listed as one of Rocketlist's Top 20 Companies to Work For, Fintech50's Hottest Fintechs to watch, and Sifted's Top UK Startups to follow in 2020. It was awarded best social innovation at the Europas in 2020. 

According to Augmentum Fintech, Farewill grew by 10x between January 2019 and July 2020. Like many other unprofitable tech startups, Farewill announced redundancies in 2022.

Farewill's position in the death industry and work with charities has been a topic of discussion due to Farewill's unregulated status. Farewill's CEO has criticized the sector as “overtly traditional”, with prices that are “unaffordably high”. In 2020, the Financial Times questioned the need for new technology in this sector.

Services

Direct
Farewill offers a number of services including will-writing (online and over the phone), a direct cremation service a probate service, and a subscription-based will update service. 

Farewill state that users can complete an online will in 15 minutes for £90. An additional service, at £10 per year allows for the same will to be updated an unlimited number of times.

The will-writing process on Farewill is based on questions that the user answers to provide the necessary information. After this, the user goes through a payment process, and then they can download and sign the document in the presence of their chosen witnesses to finally obtain their legal will. 

Direct cremations - where the cremation happens privately and the ashes are returned to the family afterwards - start from £980. This has been reported as being around a third of the UK average cost for direct cremation, and around a fifth of the average UK funeral cost.  

Probate services through Farewill cost from £595. 

In 2016, TechCrunch wrote of their data privacy concerns of storing wills digitally, online. This led to Farewill responding that user data is stored on Amazon's Secure Storage Service, in Ireland, encrypted using AES-256 encryption.

Charity partners
The company has partnered with 50 UK charities, including Cancer Research UK, British Heart Foundation, McMillan, The Royal British Legion, and Christian Aid. The charities provide access to the will-writing service to encourage bequeathals to their organisation. 

It is estimated that this has generated over £260 million in pledged income, across the charities, since Farewill launched.

CEO – Dan Garrett 
Dan Garrett is the chief executive officer and co-founder of Farewill. He completed an MSc in Design at the Royal College of Art, a Master of Structural Engineering at Oxford University, and an MSc in Global Innovation Design at Imperial College London.

Garrett started Farewill after working in a Japanese residential home where he saw what he would later characterize as ‘the ineffectiveness of the death care industry’.  When he returned to the UK, prior to starting Farewill, he organised 15 funerals and obtained will-writing qualifications.

Dan Garrett was the 2019 winner of the Legal Innovation Awards Outstanding Innovator Award.

Response to the COVID-19 Pandemic
During the COVID-19 pandemic, Farewill saw demand for direct cremations increase by 300% and demand for wills 12 times higher than normal. 

Partnering with former rugby professional Gareth Thomas, Farewill campaigned for an update to legislation on wills, as rules requiring wills to be witnessed were proving impractical due to social distancing measures. The Ministry of Justice investigated temporarily pausing such requirements.

From April 1st 2020, Farewill began providing free will-writing services to all NHS staff. It was reported in July 2020 that over 15,000 NHS workers had used the free wills service.

Funding and investors
 
Farewill has raised £30M in total. 

After a number of seed rounds, a series A round occurred In January 2019, which raised £7.5M from 10 investors. This was said to be used to double the size of Farewill's workforce.

On the 8th of July 2020, the company raised another Series B Round funding, led by venture capital firm Highland Europe. This round totalled £20 million, at what is believed to be a £70 million valuation, and was said to be used to expand and improve the service offering through the UK. Notable investors in this round included Keen Venture Partners, Richard Pierson of Headspace, Broadhaven Capital Partners and VentureFunders. 

Current investors publicly invested in Farewill are Alex Chesterman, Augmentum Fintech, DMG Ventures, Broadhaven Capital Partners, Errol Damelin, Highland Europe, Jamjar Investments, Keen Venture Partners, Kindred Capital, Microsoft, Richard Pierson (of Headspace), SAATCHIiNVEST, SBRI Healthcare, Taaveet Hinrikus, TinyVC, Tracy Terrill, Taavet Hinrikus of TransferWise and VentureFounders.

References

External links
 

Wills and trusts in the United Kingdom
British companies established in 2015
2015 establishments in England
Internet properties established in 2015
Haggerston
Financial services companies established in 2015